Elisabeth Wilhelmina "Ellen" Hogerwerf (born 10 February 1989) is a Dutch rower. She is a three time Olympian and an Olympic silver medalist in the coxless four at Tokyo 2020. 

Hogerwerf placed eighth in the double sculls at the 2012 Olympics and sixth in the eights at the 2016 Rio Games. She won a bronze medal at the 2011 World Championships and two silver medals at the European championships in 2015–2016. She was a member of the Dutch coxless four, along with Karolien Florijn, Ymkje Clevering and Veronique Meester, that won an Olympic silver medal in Tokyo 2020. The same crew was a three-time European Champion (in 2019, 2020 and 2021) and won a silver medal at the 2019 World Rowing Championships.

Hogerwerf has a degree in mechanical engineering from Delft University of Technology.

References

External links

 

1989 births
Living people
Dutch female rowers
Olympic rowers of the Netherlands
Rowers at the 2012 Summer Olympics
Rowers at the 2016 Summer Olympics
Rowers at the 2020 Summer Olympics
World Rowing Championships medalists for the Netherlands
Sportspeople from Gouda, South Holland
Medalists at the 2020 Summer Olympics
Olympic medalists in rowing
Olympic silver medalists for the Netherlands
21st-century Dutch women